110 Grant Apartments is a 303-ft (101 m) tall skyscraper in Minneapolis, Minnesota. The building was designed by Hammel, Green and Abrahamson. It was constructed from 1983 to 1985 and has 32 floors. It is the 32nd tallest building in Minneapolis.

See also 
 List of tallest buildings in Minneapolis

References

External links 
One Ten Grant Website

Apartment buildings in Minnesota
Residential skyscrapers in Minneapolis
Residential buildings completed in 1985